Joseph or Joe Dawson may refer to:
Joe Dawson (baseball) (1897–1978), American Major League Baseball pitcher
Joe Dawson (basketball) (born 1960), American former professional basketball player
Joe Dawson (boxer), English boxer in the 1970s
Joe Dawson (Highlander), a fictional character portrayed by Jim Byrnes in the American TV series Highlander
Joe Dawson (racing driver) (1889–1946), American racecar driver
Joseph Dawson III (born 1970), United States District Judge
Joseph Bernard Dawson (1883–1965), New Zealand gynaecologist
Joseph T. Dawson (1914–1998), officer in the U.S. 1st Infantry Division during World War II